Rede Anhanguera de Comunicação (Anhanguera Communication Network) is an important private holding companies of mass media in the São Paulo state. It is headquartered in Campinas, São Paulo, Brazil.

The company has the following assets:

 Newspapers:
 Correio Popular, Campinas
 Diário do Povo, Campínas
 Notícia Já, Campinas
 Gazeta do Cambuí, Campinas
 Gazeta de Ribeirão Preto, Ribeirão Preto
 Gazeta de Piracicaba, Piracicaba
 Magazines:
 Metrópole, Campinas
 Datacorp, a polling and research company
 Grafcorp, a printing office
 Agência Anhanguera de Notícias, a news agency
 Websites:
 Cosmo On-Line

RAC's CEO and main shareholder is Silvino de Godoy Neto.

References

External links
 Correio Popular
 Diário do Povo
 Notícia Já
 Gazeta do Cambui
 Gazeta de Piracicaba
 Gazeta de Ribeirão Preto
 Metrópole
 Datacorp
 Agência Anhangüera de Notícias
 Cosmo On-Line

Mass media in Campinas
Mass media companies of Brazil